Bhoodha Ka Bas is a village in the Laxmangarh administrative region of the Sikar district of Indian state Rajasthan. Bhoodha Ka Bas village is separated from the Beerodi Bari village and situated in the north-east side of the Sikar district.

There are in total 52 families residing in the village. The village has population of 317 of which 161 are males while 156 are females as per 2011 Census of India. Average Sex Ratio of the village is 969 which is higher than Rajasthan state average of 928.

History
The village is not new but until 2008 it was known as Malio Ki Dhani and it was an integral part of the village Beerodi Bari. In year 2008 it was declared as a revenue village by the district collector of Sikar district and its new name Bhoodha Ka Bas came into the existence. Later it was also added into government records.

Government
Village falls under Beerodi Bari panchayat samiti and current sarpanch is Rajendra  Prasad Bhaskar. There are total 11 wards in the Beerodi Bari panchayat samiti and Bhoodha Ka Bas comes under ward number 1 and 2 (partially) of the panchayat samiti.

Economy
Most of the people of the village are engaged in the farming activities. Agriculture mainly dependent on the monsoon rains although today many farmers also using artesian wells for irrigation of their crops. Some people doing their own business, few peoples are employed as government teacher or in other state government jobs, there are also some peoples those served in Indian armed forces. Village also have few engineers and doctors as well.

Geography and climate

Geography

Climate
Village has a hot summer, scanty rainfall, a chilly winter season and a general dryness of the air, except in the brief monsoon season. The average maximum and minimum temperatures are 28 - 30 and 15 - 16 degrees Celsius, respectively.

Transportation
Village is connected by gravel road to the Beerodi Bari village and Nawalgarh town. The Nearest railway station to the village is Nawalgarh railway station, which is situated on the Sikar-Loharu broad gauge line section. Nawalgarh railway station is approximately  far away from the village and well connected from Jaipur, Delhi and other cities. Camel carts and bullock carts were formerly the chief means of transportation and are being replaced these days by bicycles, motorcycle and other four wheeler automobiles. Few villagers also prefer walk to Nawalgarh and other surrounding places of the village due to their proximity. In the rainy season, womenfolk can be seen bringing grass on their heads for cows and buffaloes.

Education
Today young generation of the village claim to be fully literate all children now go to surrounding town Nawalgarh to attend schools, colleges and coaching's. Village has one government primary school. However still many old women's remain illiterate, although literacy rate is improving year by year. Some students of the village studied at various pioneering engineering and medical institutes. Besides this, other careers such as teaching, nursing, and defense forces are also popular among the young generation of the village.

Literacy rate
The overall literacy rate of the village is higher compared to the Rajasthan state. In the year 2011, literacy rate of the village was 87.05% compared to 66.11% of Rajasthan. Village has 95.83% male and 77.61% female literacy rate.

Religion, society and culture

Religion
All people of the village are hindu and follow Hindu rituals. Moreover, entire population of the village belongs to Kamma gotra, which belongs to mali caste.

Society and culture
Village society is governed solely by hindu rituals although the younger generation has been affected by western cultural influences. Parda, the practice of using veils to cover the face and other parts of the body is discouraged these days.

Sports, entertainment and festivals

Sports
Most of the children's and young generation of the village play cricket, volleyball and football. Village have its own playground to play these sports.

Entertainment
Folk songs are sung by women's during weddings and on other social occasions. Menfolk sing dhamaal (traditional Holi songs). Many villagers own Computers, TV's as well as radios and satellite dishes. The sound of popular Hindi music emanating from stereos and other devices is heard from different houses during the afternoon and evening.

Festivals
Villagers celebrate all major hindu festivals. Some major festivals which are celebrated by the villagers are a few Holi, Deepawali, Makar Sankranti, Raksha Bandhan, Sawan, Teej, Gangaur and Gauga Peer.

Gallery

See also
Sikar district
Laxmangarh

References

External links

 Google map view of Bhoodha Ka Bas
 Details of Sarpanch in Sikar district
 Voter List of Birodi Bari and Bhoodha Ka Bass
Official web page of Sikar district
 Official web page of Sikar district (archived)
 List of all the land records
 List of all villages of Rajasthan with their panchayat samiti

Villages in Sikar district